During the 15th Congress, there were two special elections in the , both held in the year 1818.  The 6th district at that time was a plural district with two seats, both of which became vacant at different times in 1818.  The first vacancy was caused by John Ross (DR) resigning on February 24, 1818 and the second was caused by Samuel D. Ingham (DR) resigning July 6.

March election
The first election, to fill the vacancy left by Ross' resignation, was held March 3.

Rogers took his seat March 24, during the First Session

October election
The second election, to fill the vacancy left by Ingham's resignation, was held October 13, the same time as the elections for the 16th Congress

Moore ran unopposed and took his seat November 16, at the start of the Second Session of the 15th Congress.

See also
List of special elections to the United States House of Representatives

References

Pennsylvania 1818 06
Pennsylvania 1818 06
1818 06
Pennsylvania 06
United States House of Representatives 06
United States House of Representatives 1818 06
March 1818 events
October 1818 events